is an autobahn in Germany that starts in Dinslaken and runs with three breaks along Duisburg, Düsseldorf and Cologne to Bonn.

In Duisburg it is also the city highway.

Between Cologne and Bonn the A 59 has the nickname "Flughafenautobahn" (Airport motorway), because it runs along the Cologne Bonn Airport.

Exit list 

 

 

 

 

 
|-
|colspan="3"|

 

 

 

 

|-
|colspan="3"|

|-
|colspan="2"|
| Kölner Ring
|-
|colspan="3"|

 

 

 ((Airport)

 

|}

External links 
 

59
A059